James Peeble Ewing Kennaway (5 June 1928 – 21 December 1968) was a Scottish novelist and screenwriter. He was born in Auchterarder in Perthshire and attended Glenalmond College.

Biography
Born to a middle class family in Auchterarder, his father was a lawyer who died when James 12 years old.  His mother was a doctor.  He attended Cargilfield Preparatory School in Edinburgh from the age of 8. He was later head boy.  He then attended Glenalmond College. At the age of eighteen James Kennaway was called up for two years of National Service. He initially served with his father's World War I regiment the Black Watch and then with the Queen's Own Cameron Highlanders. He was commissioned into the 1st Battalion of the Gordon Highlanders.

After National Service James Kennaway went up to Trinity College, Oxford to study Politics, Philosophy and Economics (1948). Here he met his future wife, Susan Edmonds and married her in 1951. Their son is the author Guy Kennaway.

Career
His best known novel was his first, Tunes of Glory (1956), which was turned into a well-known film of the same name starring Alec Guinness and John Mills. Kennaway also wrote the screenplay.  It was a realistic work, set in the army just after the Second World War, and drawing to some extent on Kennaway's own experiences.  This was not typical of his later output, some of which was more experimental in nature.

His other works were the short story The Dollar Bottom in Lilliput filmed in 1981 as The Dollar Bottom winning an Academy Award. He wrote the novels Household Ghosts (1961) adapted as a feature film entitled Country Dance (1970), The Mindbenders (1963) based on his screenplay of the film of the same name, The Bells of Shoreditch (1963), Some Gorgeous Accident (1967), The Cost of Living like This (1969) and Silence (1972) – the final two works were posthumous.

A stage adaptation of Some Gorgeous Accident was presented at the Assembly Rooms as part of the Edinburgh Festival Fringe in August 2010.

He was also a successful screenwriter.  His films include Violent Playground (1958), Tunes of Glory (1960), The Mind Benders (1963) and Battle of Britain (1969).

Kennaway died of a heart attack while driving home to Lechlade, Gloucestershire from London at the age of 40.

His  daughter  Jane  was  a  singer  and  had  a  minor  hit  with  "I.O.U."  in  1981.

See also
 Scottish literature

References

Further reading
Susan Kennaway, The Kennaway Papers (Jonathan Cape) 1981 
Trevor Royle, James & Jim, A Biography of James Kennaway (Mainstream Publishing) 1983

External links
 
 Article from Canongate.net
 Article from The List magazine's 100 Best Scottish Books of all Time
 Murphy, Robert , Criterion Collection essay
 Article from The Oscar Site

1928 births
1968 deaths
People educated at Cargilfield School
People educated at Glenalmond College
Scottish novelists
Scottish screenwriters
20th-century British novelists
20th-century British dramatists and playwrights
People from Perth and Kinross
People from Lechlade
20th-century British screenwriters